Ivory Bank is a commercial bank in South Sudan. It is one of the commercial banks licensed to operate in South Sudan, by the Bank of South Sudan, the national banking regulator.

The bank was one of the earliest financial institutions opened to serve the banking needs of the people in South Sudan.

History
Ivory Bank was founded in 1994 by a group of South Sudanese businesspeople to serve the banking needs of the people and businesses of South Sudan. The bank originally maintained its headquarters in Khartoum, Sudan. In April 2009, the bank relocated the headquarters to Juba, the capital and largest city in South Sudan.

Branch network
, Ivory Bank maintained branches at the following locations:

 Main Branch - Juba, South Sudan
 Aweil Branch - Aweil, South Sudan
 Khartoum Branch - Khartoum, Sudan
 Malakal Branch - Malakal, South Sudan
 Renk Branch - Renk, South Sudan 
 Wau Branch - Wau, South Sudan
 Yei Branch - Yei, South Sudan
 Kaya Branch - Kaya, South Sudan
 Nimule Branch - Nimule, South Sudan
 Nasir Branch - Nasir, South Sudan
 Rejaf Branch - Rejaf, South Sudan
 Kuajok Branch-Kuajok,South Sudan

See also
 List of banks in South Sudan
 Central Bank of South Sudan

References

Banks of South Sudan
Banks established in 1994
1994 establishments in Sudan
Companies based in Juba